Pulitzer may refer to:

Joseph Pulitzer, a 20th century media magnate
Pulitzer Prize, an annual U.S. journalism, literary, and music award
Pulitzer (surname)
Pulitzer, Inc., a U.S. newspaper chain
Pulitzer Center on Crisis Reporting, a non-profit organization for journalists

See also
Politzer (disambiguation)
Politz (disambiguation)
Pollitz, Germany